The fifth competition weekend of the 2012–13 ISU Speed Skating World Cup was held in the Heilongjiang Indoor Rink in Harbin, China, from Saturday, 15 December, until Sunday, 16 December 2012.

Schedule of events
Schedule of the event:

Medal summary

Men's events

Women's events

References

5
Isu World Cup, 2012-13, 5
Sport in Harbin